The following is an overview of the members of the DC Comics superhero team known as the Super Friends (Super Powers Team in the final season), an adaptation of the Justice League of America.

Core Super Friends members
This is the list of Super Friends members that were on the show since its premiere in 1973.

Aquaman

Aquaman was a major character in the original season of the animated television series Super Friends (1973). Super Friends is often credited with having exposed Aquaman to a much wider audience outside of the comic book community. In this series, Aquaman was shown to display superstrength—hefting a bulldozer blade over his head, for example, and using it to help stop a tidal wave. He also had encyclopedic knowledge of oceanography and oceanology, in addition to his more familiar water-breathing power and aquatic telepathy.

However, the various successor series (Challenge of the Super Friends, The World's Greatest Super Friends, Super Friends, The Super Powers Team: Galactic Guardians) have been blamed for making Aquaman unpopular and even laughable by toning down his role and often incorrectly using him alongside other heroes. They are accused of having portrayed him in an unflattering light, as they focused almost exclusively on his water-breathing and telepathic powers, thus reinforcing a weak image of the character.

During his Super Friends tenure, he was often paired with Wonder Woman, leading some fans to speculate on a possible romance between the Atlantean King and the Amazon Princess. When Grant Morrison took the JLA title, it was specified that both characters share a special friendship bond.

In the first two seasons of Super Friends, he was voiced by Norman Alden, and for the rest of the series he was voiced by Bill Callaway.

Batman

Olan Soule serves as the voice of Batman in all but the last two Super Friends series, where he is replaced by Adam West (who had portrayed the character in the famous 1960s live-action series):
1973 - 1974: Super Friends
1977 - 1978: The All-New Super Friends Hour
1978 - 1979:  Challenge of the Super Friends
1979 - 1980: The World's Greatest Super Friends
1980 - 1983: Super Friends
1984 - 1985: Super Friends: The Legendary Super Powers Show
1985 - 1986: The Super Powers Team: Galactic Guardians

In the Super Powers Team: Galactic Guardians episode "The Fear," a flashback depicts Thomas and Martha Wayne being mugged by someone who might be Joe Chill. This flashback is induced by The Scarecrow. When his father tries to fight him, a young Bruce says "No Dad, he's got a..." and lightning is shown in the sky as his parents are shot. This episode represents the first time that Batman's origin is portrayed on television.

Batmobile
The Batmobile as seen in the early episodes of Super Friends was based on the Lincoln Futura design as seen on the live-action TV series starring Adam West. The main difference with the Super Friends version was that the lines of the car were modified substantially for use in animation. The most obvious change was to the nose of the car, where the hood received a "V" depression that echoed the lower fascia. This was also the first Batmobile (of any medium) to feature yellow bat emblems on the doors. This particular feature would be quickly adapted by the comics.

Beginning with the Challenge of the Super Friends in 1978, the Batmobile got revamped. This new version was developed to have a more aerodynamic hard-edged style. In addition, this Batmobile was smaller than its predecessor. It contained a sloped nose and flying buttress B-pillars. Features that were carried over from the original Super Friends Batmobile were the Bat-mask, low horizontal fins, twin bubble windshields, and blue coloring scheme.

In 1984, Super Friends revamped its format (first as Super Friends: The Legendary Super Powers Show and then as The Super Powers Team: Galactic Guardians) to serve as a tie-in to Kenner's Super Powers Collection.

Batsuit
In the various superhero animated series produced by Filmation and Hanna-Barbera, including The Batman/Superman Hour (1968–1969), Super Friends (1973–1986) and The New Adventures of Batman (1977), Batman's costume consistently resembles the blue and gray Batsuit of the Silver Age comics.

Utility belt

In proper practice, the "bat" prefix (as in batmobile or batarang) is rarely used by Batman himself when referring to his equipment, particularly after some portrayals (primarily the 1960s Batman live-action television show and the Super Friends animated series) stretched the practice to campy proportions. The 1960s television series Batman has an arsenal that includes such "bat-" names as the bat-computer, bat-scanner, bat-radar, bat-cuffs, bat-pontoons, bat-drinking water dispenser, bat-camera with polarized bat-filter, bat-shark repellent bat-spray, and bat-rope. The storyline "A Death in the Family" suggests that given Batman's grim nature, he is unlikely to have adopted the "bat" prefix on his own.

Robin

Robin appeared alongside Batman in various Super Friends shows produced by Hanna-Barbera from 1975 through 1985. These included:
Super Friends
The All-New Super Friends Hour
Challenge of the Super Friends
The World's Greatest Super Friends
Super Friends (1980 TV series)
Super Friends: The Legendary Super Powers Show
The Super Powers Team: Galactic Guardians

Robin (Dick Grayson) was voiced by Casey Kasem. This version wore the standard Robin costume, much like the film serial versions of the 1940s.

Superman
The various Super Friends series produced by Hanna-Barbera featured Danny Dark as Superman.
1973: Super Friends
1977: The All-New Super Friends Hour
1978: Challenge Of The Super Friends
1979: The World's Greatest Super Friends
1980 - 1983: Super Friends
1984: Super Friends: The Legendary Super Powers Show
1985: The Super Powers Team: Galactic Guardians

Kryptonite
The 1970s and 1980s Super Friends animated series featured kryptonite in various episodes. In the episode "Rest in Peace", Sinestro refers to a form of kryptonite called "Krypton Steel" as "a harmless form of kryptonite that only Superman can penetrate". In another episode, "Darkseid's GoldenTrap", gold kryptonite appears, which is stated to have an effective range of 20 ft (6.1 m). Blue kryptonite also makes an appearance in an episode entitled "Terror From the Phantom Zone"; Superman, aging rapidly from exposure to red kryptonite, acquires a sample of blue kryptonite which had been discovered floating in space. Since blue kryptonite harms Bizarros, Superman reasons that it would help normal Kryptonians, and thus uses it to cure himself. In "Uncle Mxyzptlk", the Wonder Twins find a red, glowing stone and take it to the Hall of Justice. They show it to Superman, who immediately reacts to it. Samurai knocks the red kryptonite to the floor but the effects of the red kryptonite cause Superman to decrease in age, becoming a bratty young child. The rest of the Super Friends refer to the kid as 'Super Brat'. In another episode, red kryptonite is exposed to Superman by Bizarro himself, causing Superman to transform into a gangly, weak klutz. In yet another episode, red kryptonite causes Superman to grow additional arms and legs. Most of the action takes place at the Fortress of Solitude where Superman finds some blue kryptonite hidden away to fight off Bizarro.  There were also some cases where just about every criminal or alien conveniently had a piece of kryptonite to weaken Superman, aliens who had never heard of Superman or Giant Space Children who had jacks made of kryptonite.  In the episode, Rokan: Enemy From Space, Superman was able to feel radiation by a gigantic chunk on the other side of the world.

Superboy
Superboy makes two appearances in the show's run. The first one is when the Hall of Justice computer runs a tape showing Lex Luthor's origin. He was voiced by Danny Dark. The other is in a short episode where Phantom Zone criminals go back in time to fight Superboy. He is saved by the arrival of Superman and Green Lantern. He was voiced by Jerry Dexter.

Wonder Woman

Wonder Woman appeared in every incarnation of the Super Friends Saturday morning animated series. She was originally voiced by Shannon Farnon and later by Connie Caulfield in Super Friends: The Legendary Super Powers Show, followed by B.J. Ward in The Super Powers Team: Galactic Guardians.

Invisible plane
The Invisible Plane is a regular feature on the Super Friends cartoon show; Wonder Woman gives a ride to Aquaman and the Wonder Twins on a regular basis. In Challenge of the Super Friends, the Invisible Plane is shown using golden lasso projectiles. Being that Super Friends is a staple of nostalgia humor, a frequent joke alludes to the question of how Wonder Woman can locate or operate her plane since it's invisible.

Magic Lasso
In the Super Friends animated series, the magic lasso possessed the ability to follow the telepathic commands of Wonder Woman, physically moving to accomplish tasks. In Super Friends, Wonder Woman constantly used the lasso to accomplish tasks using her strength and speed. In addition, its truth compelling power was used in Super Friends episode Power Pirate, but was not required as the alien decided to tell the truth without it. The truth power was used in The World's Greatest Super Friends episode "Space Knights of Camelon" and in the Challenge of the Super Friends episode "Sinbad and the Space Pirates" where Superman was snared by the lasso, but he managed to tie the mind controlled Wonder Woman with the other end before she could command him to become immobile. In that situation, Superman forces her to confess if he is her enemy or friend and the truth of her friendship with him forced from Wonder Woman broke the pirates' power over her. The magic lasso had the ability to break through mind control situations as seen in Super Friends, The Legendary Super Powers Show.

"Wonder spin"
The spin was featured infrequently on Super Friends, whenever Diana Prince needed to leave her civilian job and attend to the various crises which she and JLA teammates faced throughout the show.

In one episode of Galactic Guardians "Darkseid Deception" , Diana uses the iconic spin (created by Lynda Carter for the live action series)to transform into her guise as Wonder Woman, she also used the spin in the episode 'Village of Lost Souls".

During the final two seasons an attempt to have Lynda Carter to voice Wonder Woman alongside Adam West as Batman fell through due to scheduling.

Secondary Super Friends members
Eventually, the rest of the show's version of the Justice League became part of the regular cast. Two Gleeks are Deadlier Than One indicate that the Hall of Justice is the headquarters of the Justice League of America and that its full roster (at least in that episode) includes Superman, Batman, Robin, Wonder Woman, Aquaman, the Atom, the Flash, Green Lantern, Hawkman, Apache Chief, Samurai, El Dorado and Black Vulcan and apparently doesn't include Super Friends' Wonder Twins.

Cyborg
Cyborg appeared in The Super Powers Team: Galactic Guardians (the final incarnation of Super Friends) from 1985 to 1986. He was voiced by Ernie Hudson. Cyborg's origin was told via a medical journal read by Dr. Martin Stein saying Cyborg was a promising decathlon athlete until an accident destroyed most of his body and his father replaced part of his body with machine parts. Also, he is not a Titan. He becomes fast friends with teammate Firestorm. He is an affiliate of the Justice League of America under Superman. In the introductory episode to Cyborg, "The Seeds of Doom", Cyborg's abilities save Earth from Darkseid's seeds, but as Superman warns, make Darkseid a dangerous enemy to Cyborg, so Cyborg joins the League.

Firestorm
Firestorm appeared in ABC's Super Friends: The Legendary Super Powers Show and The Super Powers Team: Galactic Guardians (the last two Super Friends series). Mark L. Taylor provided Ronnie Raymond's voice while Olan Soule provided Martin Stein's voice. The crew responsible for the first series depicted the flames on Firestorm's head as a static, fire-shaped ornament. The second series' authors made another change, transforming the hair into a waved haircut.

Flash

Flash (Barry Allen) appeared off and on in the Super Friends series throughout its run from 1973 to 1985. He initially appeared in Super Friends to help fellow Justice Leaguer, Superman. JLA members Flash, Green Lantern, and Batman eventually joined forces with Superman and the rest of the Super Friends in Challenge of the Super Friends, Super Friends: The Legendary Super Powers Show, The Super Powers Team: Galactic Guardians he was an important member of the superteam.

In the Challenge of the Super Friends series which ran from 1978–1979, he appears in every episode and has spoken lines in only twelve out of the sixteen episodes of the series.  He also had two arch enemies from the Legion of Doom, Captain Cold and Gorilla Grodd. Flash was portrayed by Jack Angel.

Green Lantern

Hal Jordan's Green Lantern was an occasional supporting character in the various Super Friends incarnations: Challenge of the Super Friends, Super Friends: The Legendary Super Powers Show, and The Super Powers Team: Galactic Guardians. Michael Rye provided the voice of the Green Lantern for these appearances.

Green Lantern was initially featured as a 'guest hero' in The All-New Super Friends Hour. Unfortunately, his powers were consistently misrepresented, such creating vehicles for transportation with his ring such as a "Lantern Jet," ignoring the fact that the power ring traditionally allows him to simply will himself to fly. Also, whenever Green Lantern would use his ring to create something, such as a life raft or a double-bladed transport helicopter, the final product would often be shown with its appropriate colors, instead of the same green shade as the power beam.

Hal Jordan and his nemesis Sinestro were also regulars in Challenge of the Super Friends (as previously mentioned) which aired 1978–1979. One notable episode featured a re-telling of Hal's origin in which the dying Abin Sur passes on his ring.

Hawkgirl
Hawkgirl (Shayera Hol) appeared in a few episodes of the Super Friends paired alongside her husband Hawkman.

Hawkman
Hawkman (Katar Hol) has appeared as a Super Friend in The All-New Super Friends Hour, Challenge of the Super Friends, Super Friends: The Legendary Super Powers Show, and The Super Powers Team: Galactic Guardians. His voice was provided by Jack Angel. Hawkman appears in almost every episode of Challenge of the Super Friends, but has spoken lines in only thirteen out of the sixteen episodes of this series.

International Super Friends members

Apache Chief
Apache Chief is a Native American superhero from the various Super Friends cartoons created by Hanna-Barbera. He was one of the new heroes added (along with Black Vulcan, Rima the Jungle Girl, El Dorado and Samurai) to increase the number of non-white characters in the Super Friends ranks. He was voiced by Michael Rye.

In the Challenge of the Super Friends Series, Apache Chief was seen in every episode except one, but had spoken lines in nine out of the sixteen episodes of the series. His arch enemy from the Legion of Doom was Giganta, who also happens to be an original arch enemy of Wonder Woman.

By speaking the word "Inyuk-chuk" ("Big Man"), Apache Chief could grow to vast sizes. Allthough it may seem he has limitless height he still has human qualities, but in an episode titled "Colossus", Apache Chief "Inyuk-chuks" himself to cosmic proportions to battle the Colossus, a titanic space creature that plucked Earth from its orbit and placed it in a small (relative to him) glass bottle. He also spoke in stereotypical "Native American English" and recited vaguely Native American philosophy.

Black Vulcan
Originally introduced as a way to add a more culturally diverse roster to the team in the All-New Super Friends Hour series, Black Vulcan (voiced by Buster Jones) was the Super Friends' resident black superhero, although his character mostly refrains from being seen as a harsh stereotype. As originally depicted, Black Vulcan's costume had the super-hero equivalent of pants, but due to mistakes in coloring and animation, in later episodes his legs are bare.

His powers include the ability to emit electricity from his hands, as well as fly by charging his lower body with energy.

On a few occasions, he exhibited powers he had not had before, such as the ability to assume a form of pure energy and travel at the speed of light (in an attempt to escape a black hole). He was even able to travel back in time by fluctuating his body's energy in such a way that it opened a rift in space.

El Dorado
El Dorado was created solely for the Super Friends cartoons to fill the void of an Hispanic superhero. He has never appeared in a DC Comic.

He first appeared as minor character in the Super Friends animated shorts, which aired in 1981 season and later in Super Friends: The Legendary Super Powers Show as a full-time member. El Dorado  from a non specified Latino nation was added as one of several attempts to encourage diversity among the characters. Like other ethnic characters added during this period, he was seen as somewhat stereotypical. El Dorado spoke broken English with an accent, sporadically substituting common Spanish words or phrases, such as adding words like "rapido" and replacing nearly every instance of "yes" with "si".

Because he was created primarily to fill the void of a Latin American character on the show, El Dorado's powers were not well-defined and were highly ambiguous. His most frequently used ability was teleportation, which he accomplished by wrapping his cape over his body and vanishing. Anyone or anything he wrapped his cape around could also be teleported with him, and there appeared to be no limit to the distance he could travel. Another of his frequently used powers was the ability to generate illusions from his eyes. He also exhibited some degree of mental powers, including telepathy and possibly extending beyond. In later incarnations, his powers were more well-defined. He had telepathic powers and the ability to create illusions.

He was voiced by Fernando Escandon.

Rima
Rima the Jungle Girl appeared in three episodes of Hanna-Barbera's The All-New Super Friends Hour during the 1977-78 season, alongside such mainstays as Aquaman, Batman, and Wonder Woman.
Rima, also known as Rima the Jungle Girl, is the fictional heroine of W. H. Hudson's 1904 novel Green Mansions: A Romance of the Tropical Forest. In it, Rima, a primitive girl of the shrinking rain forest of South America, meets Abel, a political fugitive. A film adaptation of Green Mansions was made in 1959 starring Audrey Hepburn

In her run with the Super Friends TV series, she is often known for being one of the new 'affirmative action heroes' during that period. Along with characters Apache Chief, Black Vulcan, El Dorado and Samurai, Rima is considered a minority character. Being both female and ethnic, she was added during the 1977 overhaul of the show's all-white, mostly-male cast of heroes.

Samurai
Samurai's real name is Toshio Eto, and he is of Japanese descent. He was one of the later additions to the team along with other ethnically diverse heroes in an effort for the show to promote cultural diversity. His voice actor is Jack Angel. In addition to being a prominent figure in several other animated shows, Angel also did the voice for The Flash and Hawkman.

Samurai appears in The All-New Super Friends Hour, Challenge of the Super Friends, Super Friends: The Legendary Super Powers Show, and The Super Powers Team: Galactic Guardians. Although not outwardly resembling a traditional samurai, Samurai upholds the code of the Bushido, sometimes relating everything he or someone else does to the ancient tradition.  Although he displays a number of powers, the one he relies on most often is the ability to manipulate wind.  He can fly by creating a small tornado around his lower body and can conjure powerful gusts from his hands that can knock back even large objects.

One-shot Super Friends members
The following is an overview of characters who only made one appearance on the series.

Green Arrow

The first television appearance of Green Arrow was a single guest spot in an episode of the original 1973 incarnation of Super Friends. He was voiced by Norman Alden. He was referred to as a "Staunch member of the Justice League of America."

Plastic Man
Plastic Man made his animated debut in a cameo appearance in the Super Friends episode "Professor Goodfellow’s G.E.E.C." voiced by Norman Alden.

Teen sidekicks and their pets

Wendy and Marvin
Wendy Harris and Marvin White are two junior superheroes in training who were created in an era in which many cartoons featured main characters with sidekicks who were supposed to serve two purposes: comic relief and viewer identification. In the comics, some additional information was given. Wendy is the niece of Harvey Harris, a detective who once trained Batman when he was still a teenager. It was postulated in an editorial column that she may have been the Earth-One version of Wendi Harris Tyler, wife of the first Hourman. Marvin (who was given the last name of White in the comics) was the son of Diana Prince, the nurse whose name Wonder Woman took when she came to Man's World, and her husband Dan White. Thus, Marvin had a sort of familial connection to the Super Friends. The Super Friends were designed to help teach young crimefighters how to be superheroes. While Wendy never wore any special costume, Marvin was always dressed with a green cape and a white shirt with a big green letter "M" in a yellow circle on its chest. Wendy and Marvin would later be revamped and used in the Teen Titans comic book as support characters. Marvin was killed and Wendy (who in this version was revealed to be the daughter of the villain the Calculator) was left with spinal cord injuries, denying her the use of her legs.

Wonder Dog
In the Super Friends animated series, Wonder Dog is portrayed as the pet/sidekick of Wendy and Marvin. He appears in all 16 episodes of the original television series. This version of Wonder Dog also appeared in the first six issues of the Super Friends comic book series.

Wonder Twins
The duo made their debut in The All-New Super Friends Hour and went on to appear in Challenge of the Super Friends, The World's Greatest Super Friends, Super Friends, and Super Friends: The Legendary Super Powers Show. Zan (voiced by Michael Bell) and Jayna (voiced by Liberty Williams) are siblings from the planet Exxor (also spelled Exor) who were being informally trained by the superheroes. Unlike their predecessors, Wendy Harris and Marvin White, this pair was able to participate in combat with abilities of their own.

The characters were later introduced in the Super Friends comic, where they were far more competent and heroic.

Their powers were activated when the twins touched each other and spoke the words, "Wonder Twin powers, activate!" (In the comics, it was revealed that this phrase was unnecessary, just a habit of theirs.) As they were about to transform, they would each announce their intended form. For example, Zan would announce, "Form of a glacier!" Jayna would then announce her intended animal form.
Zan can transform into water at any state (solid, liquid, gas). In the case of becoming solid ice, he can also become any form he chooses, from a cage for a criminal to complex machinery (such as a rocket engine). He also changed into a gelatinous form at one point. On another occasion, he transformed into liquid nitrogen. By combining with already-existing water, Zan could also increase his mass or volume in the water form chosen. In addition, he could transform himself into weather patterns involving water, such as a blizzard, a monsoon, or a typhoon. 
Jayna can transform into any animal, whether real, mythological, indigenous to Earth or to some other planet, like Beast Boy, so long as she knows the name.
In addition, the two shared a telepathic link, enabling one to alert the other over a distance when in dire circumstances.  Their mutual telepathy would also explain how they were able to assume forms that allowed cooperation without any previous discussion of strategy.

Gleek
Gleek is a blue "space monkey" and the pet of Zan and Jayna, the Wonder Twins. Gleek is often used as comic relief for the series, as the character often gets into mischief. A joke involving Gleek often ends episodes of the Super Friends in which he appears. Gleek has a stretchable, prehensile tail which can be quite useful. Gleek is also highly intelligent, as he clearly understands spoken English.  He communicates through the use of sign language, acting out scenes, and chattering in an unintelligible alien tongue. Gleek also helps the characters when they need to travel: Jayna becomes an eagle, Zan becomes water, and Gleek produces a bucket to hold Zan while Jayna carries them both.

He debuted in The All-New Super Friends Hour, which first aired September 10, 1977. Gleek's vocalizations were provided by Michael Bell.

References

Lists of DC Comics animated television characters
Super Friends characters
Super Friends lists
Lists of characters in American television animation